Diplomacy is the sixth studio album by Norwegian indie rock band Kakkmaddafakka. It was released on March 22, 2019.

Track listing
"My Name" – 3:44
"Runaway Girl" – 3:03
"The Rest" – 4:04
"Sin" – 2:57
"Get Go" – 3:45
"Frequency" – 3:16
"Moon Man" – 3:35
"Naked Blue" – 3:54
"This Love" – 4:21

Personnel
Kakkmaddafakka – performer
Matias Tellez – production, mixing
Bo Kondren – mastering

References

Kakkmaddafakka albums
2019 albums